Gunda proxima is a species of moth in the family Bombycidae. It was described by Roepke in 1924. It is found in Asia, including Indonesia and Vietnam.

The wingspan is 45–50 mm for females and 32–34 mm for males.

The larvae have been recorded feeding on Ficus elastica.

References

External links
 Clenora epigrypa at Encyclopedia of Life

Moths described in 1924
Bombycidae